Cornelius Eduardus Hermans (6 February 1897 – 23 November 1992) was a Belgian Flemish nationalist politician and writer.

Hermans saw service with the Belgian Army during the First World War before becoming involved in politics as a member of the nationalist Frontpartij. As punishment for his activities in the Flemish movement he was sent to a penal military unit: the infamous woodchopping platoon of the Orne (Peloton Spécial Forestier) located in Orne, Normandy in July 1918. After World War I he served the Frontparij in the Belgian parliament from 1929 to 1932. He quit the Frontpartij in 1933 to join Verdinaso and soon became known for his pro-Nazi Germany stance in journals such as De Schelde, Volk en Staat and Strijd. His membership came to an end the following year when he argued with Joris van Severen and so left the group to join the Flemish National Union. Serving as an arrondissement leader for the group from 1935 to 1940, he also returned to parliament as a VNV representative from 1939 to 1944.

Given his disposition towards Nazism Hermans became an enthusiastic collaborator after the invasion. Along with René Lagrou, he was the founder of the Algemeene-SS Vlaanderen, the Flemish SS, in 1940. Having left his official engagements with VNV in October 1940 to concentrate on this assignment he also edited the new movement's journal SS-Man. In the later years of the war Hermans went to Germany to broadcast propaganda over the radio in Bremen.

Hermans was sentenced to death in absentia after the Second World War but he was not arrested until his capture in Germany in November 1946. He was returned to Belgium where his sentence was commuted to life imprisonment and he was freed in 1955. He largely remained aloof from political involvement following his release, apart from a spell in the Vlaamse Militanten Orde during the 1970s.

References

20th-century Belgian criminals
1897 births
1992 deaths
Belgian Army personnel of World War I
Belgian collaborators with Nazi Germany
Belgian radio presenters
Belgian people convicted of war crimes
Belgian propagandists
Flemish politicians
Flemish writers
Nazi propagandists
People extradited to Belgium
Belgian prisoners sentenced to death
Prisoners sentenced to death by Belgium
People sentenced to death in absentia
People from Turnhout
Belgian Waffen-SS personnel